Shenchi County is a county in the northwest of Shanxi province, China. It is under the administration of Xinzhou city.

Climate

References

External links
www.xzqh.org 

 
County-level divisions of Shanxi
Xinzhou